Aethes cinereoviridana is a species of moth of the family Tortricidae. It was described by Kennel in 1899. It is found in Xinjiang, China and other places in Central Asia.

References

cinereoviridana
Moths described in 1899
Moths of Asia
Taxa named by Julius von Kennel